Henry of Marle, seigneur de Presles, was chancellor of France under king Charles VI from 1413 to 1418.  As a faithful companion of John I of Berry, he was assassinated in the Conciergerie during the massacres of the Armagnacs in the prisons of Paris on 29 May 1418.

Sources
Françoise Autrand, Charles VI le roi fou

People of the Hundred Years' War
1418 deaths
Year of birth unknown